Fallbach is a river of Tyrol, Austria, a left tributary of the Inn at Baumkirchen. It should not be confused with the similarly-named river, a left Inn tributary in Innsbruck.

The source of the Fallbach is north of Absam in the Gleirsch-Halltal Chain.

References

Rivers of Tyrol (state)
Rivers of Austria